The 2022–23 season is Morecambe's 99th season since formation, their 16th consecutive season in the Football League, and their second consecutive season in League One, the third tier of English football. They also competed in the FA Cup, EFL Cup and EFL Trophy.

Transfers

In

Out

Loans in

Loans out

Pre-season and friendlies
Morecambe announced four pre-season matches on 20 May 2022. Five days later, a home fixture against Middlesbrough was confirmed. On 13 June, a behind closed doors meeting with Huddersfield Town was added to the calendar.

Competitions

Overall record

League One

League table

Results summary

Results by round

Matches

On 23 June, the league fixtures were announced.

FA Cup

The Shrimps were drawn away to Sheffield Wednesday in the first round.

EFL Cup

Morecambe were drawn at home to Stoke City in the first round and away to Rotherham United in the second round.

EFL Trophy

On 20 June, the initial Group stage draw was made, grouping Morecambe with Harrogate Town and Hartlepool United. Three days later, Everton U21s joined Northern Group A. In the second round, Morecambe were drawn away to Lincoln City.

References

Morecambe
Morecambe F.C. seasons